Bagsiad is a small town at altitude of 2000m which is a central area for two village panchayats (i.e. Sharan and Kandha-Bagsiad) in tehsil Thunag of Seraj constituency in district Mandi, Himachal Pradesh.13th Chief Minister of Himachal Pradesh Jai Ram Thakur has completed his schooling from government school in this town. 
–Education facilities: There are government owned as well as private school in this town, among which are primary school (LKG to 5th), Senior secondary school (6th to 12th) and Sarswati Vidya Mandir (LKG to th). Also some Himachal Pradesh Govt. owned professional institutions including industrial training institute (ITI) and recently third government B. pharmacy college has been opened in this town, First batch will be started in the end for July 2019. 
–There is a civil hospital (building under construction phase) to serve the public and their health related issues.

References

Villages in Mandi district